Precordial concordance, also known as QRS concordance is when all precordial leads on an electrocardiogram are either positive (positive concordance) or negative (negative concordance). When there is a negative concordance, it almost always represents a life-threatening condition called ventricular tachycardia because there is no other condition that suggests any abnormal conduction from the apex of the heart to the upper parts. However, in positive concordance another rare conditions such as left side accessory pathways or blocks are also possible.

References

Electrophysiology
Physiology